

Events

Pre-1600
 657 – First Fitna: In the Battle of Siffin, troops led by Ali ibn Abu Talib clash with those led by Muawiyah I.
 811 – Battle of Pliska: Byzantine Emperor Nikephoros I is killed and his heir Staurakios is seriously wounded.
 920 – Rout of an alliance of Christian troops from Navarre and Léon against the Muslims at the Battle of Valdejunquera.
1309 – Henry VII is recognized King of the Romans by Pope Clement V.
1509 – The Emperor Krishnadevaraya ascends to the throne, marking the beginning of the regeneration of the Vijayanagara Empire.
1529 – Francisco Pizarro González, Spanish conquistador, is appointed governor of Peru.
1579 – Francis Drake, the English explorer, discovers a major bay on the coast of California (San Francisco). 
1581 – Plakkaat van Verlatinghe (Act of Abjuration): The northern Low Countries declare their independence from the Spanish king, Philip II.

1601–1900
1703 – During the Bavarian Rummel the rural population of Tyrol drove the Bavarian Prince-Elector Maximilian II Emanuel out of North Tyrol with a victory at the Pontlatzer Bridge and thus prevented the Bavarian Army, which was allied with France, from marching as planned on Vienna during the War of the Spanish Succession.
1745 – The first recorded women's cricket match takes place near Guildford, England.
1758 – French and Indian War: The Siege of Louisbourg ends with British forces defeating the French and taking control of the Gulf of Saint Lawrence.
1775 – The office that would later become the United States Post Office Department is established by the Second Continental Congress. Benjamin Franklin of Pennsylvania takes office as Postmaster General.
1788 – New York ratifies the United States Constitution and becomes the 11th state of the United States.
1803 – The Surrey Iron Railway, arguably the world's first public railway, opens in south London, United Kingdom.
1814 – The Swedish–Norwegian War begins.
1822 – José de San Martín arrives in Guayaquil, Ecuador, to meet with Simón Bolívar.
  1822   – First day of the three-day Battle of Dervenakia, between the Ottoman Empire force led by Mahmud Dramali Pasha and the Greek Revolutionary force led by Theodoros Kolokotronis.
1847 – Liberia declares its independence.
1861 – American Civil War: George B. McClellan assumes command of the Army of the Potomac following a disastrous Union defeat at the First Battle of Bull Run.
1863 – American Civil War: Morgan's Raid ends; At Salineville, Ohio, Confederate cavalry leader John Hunt Morgan and 360 of his volunteers are captured by Union forces.
1882 – Premiere of Richard Wagner's opera Parsifal at Bayreuth.
  1882   – The Republic of Stellaland is founded in Southern Africa.
1887 – Publication of the Unua Libro, founding the Esperanto movement.
1890 – In Buenos Aires, Argentina the Revolución del Parque takes place, forcing President Miguel Ángel Juárez Celman's resignation.
1891 – France annexes Tahiti.
1892 – Dadabhai Naoroji is elected as the first Indian Member of Parliament in Britain.
1897 – Anglo-Afghan War: The Pashtun fakir Saidullah leads an army of more than 10,000 to begin a siege of the British garrison in the Malakand Agency of the North West Frontier Province of India.
1899 – Ulises Heureaux, the 27th President of the Dominican Republic, is assassinated.

1901–present
1908 – United States Attorney General Charles Joseph Bonaparte issues an order to immediately staff the Office of the Chief Examiner (later renamed the Federal Bureau of Investigation).
1918 – Emmy Noether's paper, which became known as Noether's theorem was presented at Göttingen, Germany, from which  conservation laws are deduced for symmetries of angular momentum, linear momentum, and energy.
1936 – Spanish Civil War: Germany and Italy decide to intervene in the war in support for Francisco Franco and the Nationalist faction.
  1936   – King Edward VIII, in one of his few official duties before he abdicates the throne, officially unveils the Canadian National Vimy Memorial.
1937 – Spanish Civil War: End of the Battle of Brunete with the Nationalist victory.
1941 – World War II: Battle of Grand Harbour, British forces on Malta destroy an attack by the Italian Decima Flottiglia MAS. Fort St Elmo Bridge covering the harbour is demolished in the process.
1941 – World War II: In response to the Japanese occupation of French Indochina, the United States, Britain and the Netherlands freeze all Japanese assets and cut off oil shipments.
1944 – World War II: The Red Army enters Lviv, a major city in western Ukraine, capturing it from the Nazis. Only 300 Jews survive out of 160,000 living in Lviv prior to occupation.
1945 – The Labour Party wins the United Kingdom general election of July 5 by a landslide, removing Winston Churchill from power.
  1945   – World War II: The Potsdam Declaration is signed in Potsdam, Germany.
  1945   – World War II:  is the last British Royal Navy ship to be sunk in the war.
  1945   – World War II: The  arrives at Tinian with components and enriched uranium for the Little Boy nuclear bomb.
1946 – Aloha Airlines begins service from Honolulu International Airport.
1947 – Cold War: U.S. President Harry S. Truman signs the National Security Act of 1947 into United States law creating the Central Intelligence Agency, United States Department of Defense, United States Air Force, Joint Chiefs of Staff, and the United States National Security Council.
1948 – U.S. President Harry S. Truman signs Executive Order 9981, desegregating the military of the United States.
1951 – Walt Disney's 13th animated film, Alice in Wonderland, premieres in London, England, United Kingdom.
1952 – King Farouk of Egypt abdicates in favor of his son Fuad.
1953 – Cold War: Fidel Castro leads an unsuccessful attack on the Moncada Barracks, thus beginning the Cuban Revolution. The movement took the name of the date: 26th of July Movement
  1953   – Arizona Governor John Howard Pyle orders an anti-polygamy law enforcement crackdown on residents of Short Creek, Arizona, which becomes known as the Short Creek raid.
  1953   – Soldiers from the 2nd Battalion, Royal Australian Regiment repel a number of Chinese assaults against a key position known as The Hook during the Battle of the Samichon River, just hours before the Armistice Agreement is signed, ending the Korean War.
1956 – Following the World Bank's refusal to fund building the Aswan Dam, Egyptian leader Gamal Abdel Nasser nationalizes the Suez Canal, sparking international condemnation.
1957 – Carlos Castillo Armas, dictator of Guatemala, is assassinated.
1958 – Explorer program: Explorer 4 is launched.
1963 – Syncom 2, the world's first geosynchronous satellite, is launched from Cape Canaveral on a Delta B booster.
  1963   – An earthquake in Skopje, Yugoslavia (present-day North Macedonia) leaves 1,100 dead.
  1963   – The Organisation for Economic Co-operation and Development votes to admit Japan.
1968 – Vietnam War: South Vietnamese opposition leader Trương Đình Dzu is sentenced to five years hard labor for advocating the formation of a coalition government as a way to move toward an end to the war.
1971 – Apollo program: Launch of Apollo 15 on the first Apollo "J-Mission", and first use of a Lunar Roving Vehicle.
1974 – Greek Prime Minister Konstantinos Karamanlis forms the country's first civil government after seven years of military rule.
1977 – The National Assembly of Quebec imposes the use of French as the official language of the provincial government.
1989 – A federal grand jury indicts Cornell University student Robert T. Morris, Jr. for releasing the Morris worm, thus becoming the first person to be prosecuted under the 1986 Computer Fraud and Abuse Act.
1990 – The Americans with Disabilities Act of 1990 is signed into law by President George H. W. Bush.
1993 – Asiana Airlines Flight 733 crashes into a ridge on Mt. Ungeo on its third attempt to land at Mokpo Airport, South Korea. Sixty-eight of the 116 people on board are killed.
1999 – Kargil conflict officially comes to an end. The Indian Army announces the complete eviction of Pakistani intruders.
2005 – Space Shuttle program: STS-114 Mission: Launch of Discovery, NASA's first scheduled flight mission after the Columbia Disaster in 2003.
  2005   – Mumbai, India receives 99.5cm of rain (39.17 inches) within 24 hours, resulting in floods killing over 5,000 people.
2008 – Fifty-six people are killed and over 200 people are injured, in the Ahmedabad bombings in India.
2009 – The militant Nigerian Islamist group Boko Haram attacks a police station in Bauchi, leading to reprisals by the Nigeria Police Force and four days of violence across multiple cities.
2011 – A Royal Moroccan Air Force Lockheed C-130 Hercules crashes near Guelmim Airport in Guelmim, Morocco. All 80 people on board are killed.
2016 – The Sagamihara stabbings occur in Kanagawa Prefecture in Japan. Nineteen people are killed.
  2016   – Hillary Clinton becomes the first female nominee for President of the United States by a major political party at the Democratic National Convention in Philadelphia.
  2016   – Solar Impulse 2 becomes the first solar-powered aircraft to circumnavigate the Earth.

Births

Pre-1600
1030 – Stanislaus of Szczepanów, Polish bishop and saint (d. 1079)
1400 – Isabel le Despenser, Countess of Worcester, English noble (d. 1439)
1502 – Christian Egenolff, German printer (d. 1555)

1601–1900
1678 – Joseph I, Holy Roman Emperor (d. 1711)
1711 – Lorenz Christoph Mizler, German physician, mathematician, and historian (d. 1778)
1739 – George Clinton, American general and politician, 4th Vice President of the United States (d. 1812)
1782 – John Field, Irish pianist and composer (d. 1837)
1791 – Franz Xaver Wolfgang Mozart, Austrian pianist, composer, and conductor (d. 1844)
1796 – George Catlin, American painter, author, and traveler (d. 1872)
1802 – Mariano Arista, Mexican general and politician, 42nd President of Mexico (d. 1855)
1819 – Justin Holland, American guitarist and educator (d. 1887)
1829 – Auguste Beernaert, Belgian politician, 14th Prime Minister of Belgium, Nobel Prize laureate (d. 1912)
1838 – Silas Soule, American soldier and whistleblower of the Sand Creek Massacre (d. 1865)
1841 – Carl Robert Jakobson, Estonian journalist and politician (d. 1882)
1842 – Alfred Marshall, English economist and academic (d. 1924)
1844 – Stefan Drzewiecki, Ukrainian-Polish engineer and journalist (d. 1938)
1854 – Philippe Gaucher, French dermatologist and academic (d. 1918)
1855 – Ferdinand Tönnies, German sociologist and philosopher (d. 1936)
1856 – George Bernard Shaw, Irish playwright and critic, Nobel Prize laureate (d. 1950)
1858 – Tom Garrett, Australian cricketer and lawyer (d. 1943)
1863 – Jāzeps Vītols, Latvian composer (d. 1948) 
1865 – Philipp Scheidemann, German journalist and politician, 10th Chancellor of Germany (d. 1939)
  1865   – Rajanikanta Sen, Indian poet and composer (d. 1910)
1874 – Serge Koussevitzky, Russian-American bassist, composer, and conductor (d. 1951)
1875 – Carl Jung, Swiss psychiatrist and psychotherapist (d. 1961)
  1875   – Ernesta Di Capua, Italian botanist and explorer (d. 1943)
  1875   – Antonio Machado, Spanish poet and academic (d. 1939)
  1877   – Jesse Lauriston Livermore, American investor and security analyst, "Great Bear of Wall Street" (d. 1940)
1878 – Ernst Hoppenberg, German swimmer and water polo player (d. 1937)
1879 – Shunroku Hata, Japanese field marshal and politician, 48th Japanese Minister of War (d. 1962)
1880 – Volodymyr Vynnychenko, Ukrainian playwright and politician, 1st Prime Minister of Ukrainian People's Republic (d. 1951)
1882 – Albert Dunstan, Australian politician, 33rd Premier of Victoria (d. 1950)
1885 – Roy Castleton, American baseball player (d. 1967)
  1885   – André Maurois, French soldier and author (d. 1967)
1886 – Lars Hanson, Swedish actor (d. 1965)
1888 – Reginald Hands, South African cricketer and rugby player (d. 1918)
1890 – Daniel J. Callaghan, American admiral, Medal of Honor recipient (d. 1942)
1892 – Sad Sam Jones, American baseball player and manager (d. 1966)
1893 – George Grosz, German painter and illustrator (d. 1959)
1894 – Aldous Huxley, English novelist and philosopher (d. 1963)
1895 – Gracie Allen, American actress and comedian (d. 1964)
1896 – Tim Birkin, English soldier and race car driver (d. 1933)
1897 – Harold D. Cooley, American lawyer and politician (d. 1974)
  1897   – Paul Gallico, American journalist and author (d. 1976)
1900 – Sarah Kafrit, Israeli politician and teacher (d. 1983)

1901–present
1903 – Estes Kefauver, American lawyer and politician (d. 1963)
1904 – Frank Scott Hogg, Canadian astronomer and academic (d. 1951)
  1904   – Edwin Albert Link, American industrialist and entrepreneur, invented the flight simulator (d. 1981)
1906 – Irena Iłłakowicz, German-Polish lieutenant (d. 1943)
1908 – Lucien Wercollier, Luxembourger sculptor (d. 2002)
1909 – Peter Thorneycroft, Baron Thorneycroft, English lawyer and politician, Chancellor of the Exchequer (d. 1994)
  1909   – Vivian Vance, American actress and singer (d. 1979)
1913 – Kan Yuet-keung, Hong Kong banker, lawyer, and politician (d. 2012)
1914 – C. Farris Bryant, American soldier, lawyer, and politician, 34th Governor of Florida (d. 2002)
  1914   – Erskine Hawkins, American trumpet player and bandleader (d. 1993)
  1914   – Ellis Kinder, American baseball player (d. 1968)
1916 – Dean Brooks, American physician and actor (d. 2013)
  1916   – Jaime Luiz Coelho, Brazilian archbishop (d. 2013)
1918 – Marjorie Lord, American actress (d. 2015)
1919 – Virginia Gilmore, American actress (d. 1986)
  1919   – James Lovelock, English biologist and chemist (d. 2022)
1920 – Bob Waterfield, American football player and coach (d. 1983)
1921 – Tom Saffell, American baseball player and manager (d. 2012)
  1921   – Jean Shepherd, American radio host, actor, and screenwriter (d. 1999)
1922 – Blake Edwards, American director, producer, and screenwriter (d. 2010)
  1922   – Jim Foglesong, American record producer (d. 2013)
  1922   – Jason Robards, American actor (d. 2000)
1923 – Jan Berenstain, American author and illustrator (d. 2012)
  1923   – Bernice Rubens, Welsh author (d. 2004)
  1923   – Hoyt Wilhelm, American baseball player and coach (d. 2002)
1925 – Jerzy Einhorn, Polish-Swedish physician and politician (d. 2000)
  1925   – Joseph Engelberger, American physicist and engineer (d. 2015)
  1925   – Gene Gutowski, Polish-American film producer (d. 2016)
  1925   – Ana María Matute, Spanish author and academic (d. 2014)
1926 – James Best, American actor, director, and screenwriter (d. 2015)
  1926   – Dorothy E. Smith, Canadian sociologist (d. 2022)
1927 – Gulabrai Ramchand, Indian cricketer (d. 2003)
1928 – Don Beauman, English race car driver (d. 1955)
  1928   – Francesco Cossiga, Italian academic and politician, 8th President of Italy (d. 2010)
  1928   – Elliott Erwitt, French-American photographer and director
  1928   – Ibn-e-Safi, Indian-Pakistani author and poet (d. 1980)
  1928   – Joe Jackson, American talent manager, father of Michael Jackson (d. 2018)
  1928   – Stanley Kubrick, American director, producer, screenwriter, and cinematographer (d. 1999)
  1928   – Peter Lougheed, Canadian lawyer and politician, 10th Premier of Alberta (d. 2012)
  1928   – Sally Oppenheim-Barnes, Baroness Oppenheim-Barnes, Irish-born English politician
1929 – Marc Lalonde, Canadian lawyer and politician, 34th Canadian Minister of Justice
  1929   – Alexis Weissenberg, Bulgarian-French pianist and educator (d. 2012)
1930 – Plínio de Arruda Sampaio, Brazilian lawyer and politician (d. 2014)
  1930   – Barbara Jefford, English actress (d. 2020)
1931 – Telê Santana, Brazilian footballer and manager (d. 2006)
1934 – Tommy McDonald, American football player (d. 2018)
1936 – Tsutomu Koyama, Japanese volleyball player and coach (d. 2012)
  1936   – Lawrie McMenemy, English footballer and manager
1938 – Bobby Hebb, American singer-songwriter (d. 2010)
  1938   – Keith Peters, Welsh physician and academic
1939 – Jun Henmi, Japanese author and poet (d. 2011)
  1939   – John Howard, Australian lawyer and politician, 25th Prime Minister of Australia
  1939   – Bob Lilly, American football player and photographer
  1939   – Richard Marlow, English organist and conductor (d. 2013)
1940 – Dobie Gray, American singer-songwriter and producer (d. 2011)
  1940   – Brian Mawhinney, Baron Mawhinney, Northern Irish-British academic and politician, Secretary of State for Transport (d. 2019)
  1940   – Bobby Rousseau, Canadian ice hockey player
1941 – Jean Baubérot, French historian and sociologist
  1941   – Darlene Love, American singer and actress
  1941   – Brenton Wood, American R&B singer-songwriter and keyboard player  
1942 – Vladimír Mečiar, Slovak politician, 1st Prime Minister of Slovakia
  1942   – Teddy Pilette, Belgian race car driver
1943 – Peter Hyams, American director, screenwriter, and cinematographer
  1943   – Mick Jagger, English singer-songwriter, producer, and actor
1945 – Betty Davis, American singer-songwriter (d. 2022)
  1945   – Helen Mirren, English actress 
1946 – Emilio de Villota, Spanish race car driver
1948 – Luboš Andršt, Czech guitarist and songwriter 
  1948   – Herbert Wiesinger, German figure skater
1949 – Thaksin Shinawatra, Thai businessman and politician, 23rd Prime Minister of Thailand
  1949   – Roger Taylor, English singer-songwriter, drummer, and producer 
1950 – Nelinho, Brazilian footballer and manager
  1950   – Nicholas Evans, English journalist, screenwriter, and producer
  1950   – Susan George, English actress and producer
  1950   – Anne Rafferty, English lawyer and judge
  1950   – Rich Vogler, American race car driver (d. 1990)
1951 – Rick Martin, Canadian-American ice hockey player (d. 2011)
1952 – Glynis Breakwell, English psychologist and academic
1953 – Felix Magath, German footballer and manager
  1953   – Robert Phillips, American guitarist
  1953   – Henk Bleker, Dutch politician
  1953   – Earl Tatum, American professional basketball player
1954 – Vitas Gerulaitis, American tennis player and coach (d. 1994)
1955 – Aleksandrs Starkovs, Latvian footballer and coach
  1955   – Asif Ali Zardari, Pakistani businessman and politician, 11th President of Pakistan
1956 – Peter Fincham, English screenwriter and producer
  1956   – Dorothy Hamill, American figure skater
  1956   – Tommy Rich, American wrestler
  1956   – Tim Tremlett, English cricketer and coach
1957 – Norman Baker, Scottish politician
  1957   – Nana Visitor, American actress
1958 – Monti Davis, American basketball player (d. 2013)
  1958   – Angela Hewitt, Canadian-English pianist
1959 – Rick Bragg, American author and journalist
  1959   – Kevin Spacey, American actor and director
1961 – Gary Cherone, American singer-songwriter 
  1961   – Andy Connell, English keyboard player and songwriter 
  1961   – Felix Dexter, Caribbean-English comedian and actor (d. 2013)
1963 – Jeff Stoughton, Canadian curler
1964 – Sandra Bullock, American actress and producer
  1964   – Ralf Metzenmacher, German painter and designer (d. 2020)
  1964   – Anne Provoost, Belgian author
1965 – Jeremy Piven, American actor and producer
  1965   – Jim Lindberg, American singer and guitarist
1966 – Angelo di Livio, Italian footballer
1967 – Martin Baker, English organist and conductor
  1967   – Tim Schafer, American video game designer, founded Double Fine Productions
  1967   – Jason Statham, English actor 
1968 – Frédéric Diefenthal, French actor and director
  1968   – Jim Naismith, Scottish biologist and academic
  1968   – Olivia Williams, English actress
1969 – Greg Colbrunn, American baseball player and coach
  1969   – Tanni Grey-Thompson, Welsh baroness and wheelchair racer 
1971 – Khaled Mahmud, Bangladeshi cricketer and coach
  1971   – Chris Harrison, American television personality
1972 – Nathan Buckley, Australian footballer and coach
1973 – Kate Beckinsale, English actress
  1973   – Mariano Raffo, Argentinian director and producer
1974 – Iron & Wine, American singer-songwriter
  1974   – Kees Meeuws, New Zealand rugby player and coach
  1974   – Dean Sturridge, English footballer and sportscaster
1975 – Ingo Schultz, German sprinter
  1975   – Joe Smith, American basketball player
  1975   – Liz Truss, English accountant and politician
1976 – Elena Kustarova, Russian ice dancer and coach
1977 – Joaquín Benoit, Dominican baseball player
  1977   – Martin Laursen, Danish footballer and manager
  1977   – Tanja Szewczenko, German figure skater 
1979 – Friedrich Michau, German rugby player
  1979   – Derek Paravicini, English pianist 
  1979   – Peter Sarno, Canadian ice hockey player
  1979   – Erik Westrum, American ice hockey player
  1979   – Juliet Rylance, English actress
1980 – Jacinda Ardern, 40th Prime Minister of New Zealand
  1980   – Dave Baksh, Canadian singer-songwriter, guitarist, and producer 
  1980   – Robert Gallery, American football player
1981 – Abe Forsythe, Australian actor, director, and screenwriter
  1981   – Maicon Sisenando, Brazilian footballer
1982 – Gilad Hochman, Israeli composer
  1982   – Christopher Kane, Scottish fashion designer
1983 – Kelly Clark, American snowboarder
  1983   – Stephen Makinwa, Nigerian footballer
  1983   – Roderick Strong, American wrestler
  1983   – Naomi van As, Dutch field hockey player
  1983   – Ken Wallace, Australian kayaker
  1983   – Delonte West, American basketball player
1984 – Kyriakos Ioannou, Cypriot high jumper
  1984   – Benjamin Kayser, French rugby player
  1984   – Sabri Sarıoğlu, Turkish footballer
1985 – Marcus Benard, American football player
  1985   – Gaël Clichy, French footballer
  1985   – Audrey De Montigny, Canadian singer-songwriter
  1985   – Mat Gamel, American baseball player
1986 – Leonardo Ulloa, Argentinian footballer
  1986   – John White, English footballer
1987 – Panagiotis Kone, Greek footballer
  1987   – Jordie Benn, Canadian ice hockey player
  1987   – Fredy Montero, Colombian footballer
1988 – Yurie Omi, Japanese announcer and news anchor
  1988   – Sayaka Akimoto, Filipino–Japanese actress and singer
1991 – Tyson Barrie, Canadian ice hockey player
1992 – Marika Koroibete, Fijian rugby player
1993 – Raymond Faitala-Mariner, New Zealand rugby league player
1994 – Ella Leivo, Finnish tennis player
1996 – Olivia Breen, British Paralympic athlete
2000 – Thomasin McKenzie, New Zealand actress

Deaths

Pre-1600
 342 – Cheng of Jin, emperor of the Jin Dynasty (b. 321)
 811 – Nikephoros I, Byzantine emperor
 899 – Li Hanzhi, Chinese warlord (b. 842)
 943 – Motoyoshi, Japanese nobleman and poet (b. 890)
 990 – Fujiwara no Kaneie, Japanese statesman (b. 929)
1380 – Kōmyō, emperor of Japan (b. 1322)
1450 – Cecily Neville, duchess of Warwick (b. 1424)
1471 – Paul II, pope of the Catholic Church (b. 1417)
1533 – Atahualpa, Inca emperor abducted and murdered by Francisco Pizarro (b. ca. 1500)
1592 – Armand de Gontant, French marshal (b. 1524)

1601–1900
1605 – Miguel de Benavides, Spanish archbishop and sinologist (b. 1552)
1611 – Horio Yoshiharu, Japanese daimyō (b. 1542)
1630 – Charles Emmanuel I, duke of Savoy (b. 1562)
1659 – Mary Frith, English criminal (b. 1584)
1680 – John Wilmot, 2nd Earl of Rochester, English poet and courtier (b. 1647)
1684 – Elena Cornaro Piscopia, Italian mathematician and philosopher (b. 1646)
1693 – Ulrika Eleonora of Denmark, queen of Sweden (b. 1656)
1712 – Thomas Osborne, 1st Duke of Leeds, English politician, Lord High Treasurer (b. 1631)
1723 – Robert Bertie, 1st Duke of Ancaster and Kesteven, English politician, Chancellor of the Duchy of Lancaster (b. 1660)
1801 – Maximilian Francis, archduke of Austria (b. 1756)
1863 – Sam Houston, American general and politician, 7th Governor of Texas (b. 1793)
1867 – Otto, king of Greece (b. 1815)
1899 – Ulises Heureaux, 22nd, 26th, and 27th President of the Dominican Republic (b. 1845)

1901–present
1915 – James Murray, Scottish lexicographer and philologist (b. 1837)
1919 – Edward Poynter, English painter and illustrator (b. 1836)
1921 – Howard Vernon, Australian actor (b. 1848)
1925 – Antonio Ascari, Italian race car driver (b. 1888)
  1925   – Gottlob Frege, German mathematician and philosopher (b. 1848)
  1925   – William Jennings Bryan, American lawyer and politician, 41st United States Secretary of State (b. 1860)
1926 – Robert Todd Lincoln, American lawyer and politician, 35th United States Secretary of War, son of Abraham Lincoln (b. 1843)
1930 – Pavlos Karolidis, Greek historian and academic (b. 1849)
1932 – Fred Duesenberg, German-American businessman, co-founded the Duesenberg Company (b. 1876)
1934 – Winsor McCay, American cartoonist, animator, producer, and screenwriter (b. 1871)
1941 – Henri Lebesgue, French mathematician and academic (b. 1875)
1942 – Roberto Arlt, Argentinian author and playwright (b. 1900)
1951 – James Mitchell, Australian politician, 13th Premier of Western Australia (b. 1866)
1952 – Eva Perón, Argentinian politician, 25th First Lady of Argentina (b. 1919)
1953 – Nikolaos Plastiras, Greek general and politician, 135th Prime Minister of Greece (b. 1883)
1957 – Carlos Castillo Armas, Authoritarian ruler of Guatemala (1954-1957)
1960 – Cedric Gibbons, British art director and production designer (b. 1893)
1964 – Francis Curzon, 5th Earl Howe, English race car driver and politician (b. 1884)
1968 – Cemal Tollu, Turkish lieutenant and painter (b. 1899)
1970 – Robert Taschereau, Canadian lawyer and jurist, 11th Chief Justice of Canada (b. 1896)
1971 – Diane Arbus, American photographer and academic (b. 1923)
1984 – George Gallup, American mathematician and statistician, founded the Gallup Company (b. 1901)
  1984   – Ed Gein, American serial killer (b. 1906)
1986 – W. Averell Harriman, American politician and diplomat, 11th United States Secretary of Commerce (b. 1891)
1988 – Fazlur Rahman Malik, Pakistani philosopher, scholar, and academic (b. 1919)
1992 – Mary Wells, American singer-songwriter (b. 1943)
1993 – Matthew Ridgway, American general (b. 1895)
1994 – James Luther Adams, American theologian and academic (b. 1901)
1995 – Laurindo Almeida, Brazilian-American guitarist and composer (b. 1917)
  1995   – Raymond Mailloux, Canadian lawyer and politician (b. 1918)
  1995   – George W. Romney, American businessman and politician, 43rd Governor of Michigan (b. 1907) 
1996 – Max Winter, American businessman and sports executive (b. 1903)
1999 – Walter Jackson Bate, American author and critic (b. 1918)
  1999   – Phaedon Gizikis, Greek general and politician, President of Greece (b. 1917)
2000 – John Tukey, American mathematician and academic (b. 1915)
2001 – Rex T. Barber, American colonel and pilot (b. 1917)
  2001   – Peter von Zahn, German journalist and author (b. 1913)
2004 – William A. Mitchell, American chemist, created Pop Rocks and Cool Whip (b. 1911)
2005 – Alexander Golitzen, Russian-born American production designer and art director (b. 1908)
  2005   – Jack Hirshleifer, American economist and academic (b. 1925)
  2005   – Gilles Marotte, Canadian ice hockey player (b. 1945)
2007 – Lars Forssell, Swedish author, poet, and playwright (b. 1928)
  2007   – Skip Prosser, American basketball player and coach (b. 1950)
2009 – Merce Cunningham, American dancer and choreographer (b. 1919)
2010 – Sivakant Tiwari, Indian-Singaporean politician (b. 1945)
2011 – Joe Arroyo, Colombian singer-songwriter and composer (b. 1955)
  2011   – Richard Harris, American-Canadian football player and coach (b. 1948)
  2011   – Sakyo Komatsu, Japanese author and screenwriter (b. 1931)
  2011   – Margaret Olley, Australian painter and philanthropist (b. 1923)
2012 – Don Bagley, American bassist and composer (b. 1927)
  2012   – Karl Benjamin, American painter and educator (b. 1925)
  2012   – Miriam Ben-Porat, Russian-Israeli lawyer and jurist (b. 1918)
  2012   – Lupe Ontiveros, American actress (b. 1942)
  2012   – James D. Watkins, American admiral and politician, 6th United States Secretary of Energy (b. 1927)
2013 – Luther F. Cole, American lawyer and politician (b. 1925)
  2013   – Harley Flanders, American mathematician and academic (b. 1925)
  2013   – Sung Jae-gi, South Korean philosopher and activist (b. 1967)
  2013   – George P. Mitchell, American businessman and philanthropist (b. 1919)
2014 – Oleh Babayev, Ukrainian businessman and politician (b. 1965)
  2014   – Charles R. Larson, American admiral (b. 1936)
  2014   – Richard MacCormac, English architect, founded MJP Architects (b. 1938)
  2014   – Sergei O. Prokofieff, Russian anthropologist and author (b. 1954)
  2014   – Roland Verhavert, Belgian director, producer, and screenwriter (b. 1927)
2015 – Bijoy Krishna Handique, Indian lawyer and politician, Indian Minister of Mines (b. 1934)
  2015   – Flora MacDonald, Canadian banker and politician, 10th Canadian Minister of Communications (b. 1926)
  2015   – Leo Reise, Jr., Canadian ice hockey player (b. 1922)
  2015   – Ann Rule, American police officer and author (b. 1931)
2017 – June Foray, American voice actress (b. 1917)
  2017   – Patti Deutsch, American voice artist and comedic actress (b. 1943)
  2017   – Ronald Phillips, American criminal (b. 1973)
2018 – Adem Demaçi, Kosovo Albanian politician and writer (b. 1936) 
  2018   – John Kline, American basketball player (b. 1931)
2019 – Russi Taylor, American voice actress (b. 1944)
  2019   – Jaime Lucas Ortega y Alamino, Cuban Roman Catholic prelate (b. 1936)
2020 – Olivia de Havilland, American actress (b. 1916)
2021 – Joey Jordison, American musician (b. 1975)

Holidays and observances
Christian feast day:
Andrew of Phú Yên
Anne (Western Christianity)
Bartolomea Capitanio
Blessed Maria Pierina
Joachim (Western Christianity)
Paraskevi of Rome (Eastern Orthodox Church)
Venera
July 26 (Eastern Orthodox liturgics)
Day of National Significance (Barbados)
Day of the National Rebellion (Cuba)
Esperanto Day
Independence Day (Liberia), celebrates the independence of Liberia from the American Colonization Society in 1847.
Independence Day (Maldives), celebrates the independence of Maldives from the United Kingdom in 1965.
Kargil Victory Day or Kargil Vijay Diwas (India)

References

External links

 
 
 

Days of the year
July